The term Seuserenre refers to the prenomens or royal names of two Egyptian pharaohs:
 Seuserenre Khyan of the 15th Hyksos dynasty
 Seuserenre Bebiankh, a native Theban king during the Second Intermediate Period. He is given a reign of 12 years in the Turin Canon